The National Council for Geocosmic Research (N.C.G.R) is a non-profit educational organization formed to promote and raise the standards of education and research in astrology. It was founded in Brewster, Massachusetts, United States, on March 6, 1971.

N.C.G.R. has a membership of over 3000 and has established 40 Chapters worldwide in 26 countries. It also sponsors several Special Interest Groups, which organize monthly lectures or informal study sessions, usually led by a well known astrologer. The N.C.G.R. administers its own education and testing program based on four levels of proficiency. The organization provides a Code Of Ethics with guidelines for prospective astrologers and publishes the Geocosmic Journal.

References

External links
NCGR web-site

Astrological organizations